The D-class (IB1) lifeboats are inflatable boats serving in the RNLI inshore lifeboat (ILB) fleet as well as a number of Independent Lifeboats around the UK and Ireland. Although they are known as the "IB1" at times, they are the latest development of the D-class lifeboat and as such are mainly referred to as a "D-class".

This class of lifeboat is one of the smallest operated by the RNLI, and they are a common sight at lifeboat stations round the coast. Unlike other members of the ILB fleet, the D-class (IB1) does not have a rigid hull. All others with the exception of the Arancia, hovercraft and all-weather lifeboat tenders are rigid inflatable boats.

The IB1 normally has a crew of three or four and is primarily used for surfer/swimmer incidents as well as assisting in cliff incidents where the casualty is near the water. The very nature of its work requires a swift response, and the IB1 can normally be afloat very quickly.

As of February 2020 the minimum crew for an RNLI IB1 was raised from 2 to 3. Some Independent Lifeboats have different crewing levels to the RNLI.

RNLI Fleet 
Source: Lifeboat World Online

References

External links 

RNLI Fleet d83

Royal National Lifeboat Institution lifeboats
Inflatable boats